The Mid-Atlantic Regional Spaceport (MARS) is a commercial space launch facility located at the southern tip of NASA's Wallops Flight Facility on Wallops Island in Virginia, just east of the Delmarva Peninsula and south of Chincoteague, Virginia, United States. It is owned and operated by the Virginia Commercial Space Flight Authority.

Background 
The Virginia General Assembly created the political subdivision Virginia Commercial Space Flight Authority (VCSFA), also known as Virginia Space, in 1995 to promote the development of the commercial space flight industry, economic development, aerospace research, and Science, Technology, Engineering, and Math (STEM) education throughout the Commonwealth. This initiative was done from the recommendations of the Batten College at Old Dominion University, with Dr. Billie Reed, a longtime professor at the University, installed as its Executive Director.

In 1997, Virginia Space entered into a Reimbursable Space Act Agreement with NASA, which provided for permitted use of land on NASA Wallops Island for the MARS launch pads. Virginia Space also applied for and was granted an FAA license to launch to orbit. This led to the establishment of the Virginia Space Flight Center, located on the southern portion of NASA Wallops Island. At the time, the Center served as a collective partnership that included the National Aeronautic and Space Administration (NASA), Old Dominion University, and Virginia Space.

In July 2003, Governors Robert Ehrlich of Maryland and Mark Warner of Virginia signed an agreement that directed the Secretary of Commerce and Trade of Virginia and the Secretary of Business and Economic Development of Maryland to form a working group to develop a concept and implementation plan for joint governance, operation, and administration of the commercial spaceport at Wallops Island. As such, the Virginia Space Flight Center was renamed as the Mid-Atlantic Regional Spaceport (MARS), reflecting the location of the facilities as opposed to the singular state.

MARS is approved for launch azimuths from 38° to 60°, making it an ideal location from which to launch to the International Space Station (ISS).

In 2007, NASA selected Virginia-based Orbital Sciences Corporation (Northrop Grumman) to participate in the Commercial Orbital Transportation Services (COTS) program and then selected Orbital for a follow-on Commercial Resupply Service (CRS) contract to build and demonstrate a new rocket, Antares, to resupply the International Space Station (ISS). The CRS contract authorized eight missions from 2012 to 2015 carrying approximately 20,000 kg of cargo to ISS as well as disposal of waste. These launches were to take place from the new state-of-the-art MARS Pad 0A.

On MARS Pad 0B, VCSFA made modifications and upgrades to launch the NASA Lunar Atmosphere and Dust Environment Explorer (LADEE) mission to the Moon in mid-2013 on a new Orbital Sciences Minotaur V launch vehicle. Also in mid-2013, the USAF launched ORS-3 from MARS Pad 0B.

MARS is one of only several sites licensed by the FAA Office of Commercial Space Transportation to launch to orbit. Additionally, Virginia is home to the NASA Langley Research Center (LARC) and National Reconnaissance Office (NRO), and as such is a recipient of a large portion of the Federal budget for Space. Finally, according to the Information Technology and Innovation Foundation, Virginia ranks first in the number of scientists and engineers as a percentage of the workforce, third in the concentration of high-tech jobs as a percentage of the workforce, and sixth in non-industry investment in research and development.

Facilities 

The Mid-Atlantic Regional Spaceport has three active launch pads.

The Launch pad 0A (LP-0A) was built for the Conestoga rocket, which made its only flight in 1995.
The launch tower was subsequently demolished in September 2008, and has now been rebuilt for use by the Northrop Grumman Innovation Systems Antares.
The pad modifications for Antares included the construction of a Horizontal Integration Facility for launcher/payload mating and a wheeled transporter/erector that will "roll out and erect the rocket on its launch pad about 24 hours prior to launch".

Launch pad 0B (LP-0B) became operational in 1999, and was subsequently upgraded with the construction of a mobile service tower, which was completed in 2004. It remains active, and is currently used by Minotaur rockets.

The facility suffered significant damage during the 28 October 2014 Antares launch failure, according to NASA officials in the immediate aftermath.
On September 30, 2015, the spaceport announced repairs on pad 0A had been completed.

In October 2018, Rocket Lab announced that it had selected MARS as its second launch site, called Rocket Lab Launch Complex-2. The company began construction in February 2019, together with the Virginia Commercial Space Flight Authority (Virginia Space). In December 2019, Rocket Lab said it had built and completed Launch Complex-2 (LC-2), a new launch pad near Pad 0A, and was ready to support missions just 10 months later with the first launch scheduled for the third quarter of 2020. At a press conference on the same day at the NASA Wallops Flight Facility, the Space Test Program of the United States Air Force (now United States Space Force) was announced as the planned first customer for the Electron launch vehicle from LC-2. The mission was planned to see a single research and development micro-satellite. This plan did not occur.

The new launch complex LC-2 also has an integration facility.

The first launch from LC-2 successfully occurred on January 24, 2023. An Electron rocket carried three satellites to orbit in a mission named "Virginia is for Launch Lovers".

Launch history

See also 

 Mid-Atlantic Regional Spaceport Launch Pad 0
 Orbital Sciences Corporation
 Rocket Lab

References

External links 

 Map: 
 Mid-Atlantic Regional Spaceport web site
 Mid-Atlantic Regional Spaceport Implementation Plan, April 2004
 Wallops Flight Facility site

Buildings and structures in Accomack County, Virginia
Rocket launch sites in the United States
Spaceports in the United States